William Stone  (September 4, 1842 – May 22, 1897) was a nineteenth-century Union Army officer, passionate Unionist, dedicated Freedmen's Bureau agent, self-educated attorney, and Attorney General of South Carolina during a turbulent era.

Parentage
William Stone was born on September 4, 1842 in East Machias, Maine.  He was the son of Laura Poor Stone, an early anti slavery activist, and Thomas Treadwell Stone, a prominent Unitarian pastor, fiery abolitionist, and Transcendentalist.  William's great grandfather, Thomas Treadwell, fought as a minuteman at Bunker Hill.   Laura Poor Stone's brother, Henry Varnum Poor, was one of the founders of the financial rating firm, Standard and Poor's.

Early life
William spent his early boyhood in Salem, Massachusetts, and later in Bolton, Massachusetts, to which his family relocated after his father's militant anti-slavery sermons led his resentful Salem parishioners to reject him.

The Stone family finances were largely exhausted by Harvard University educations for William's two older brothers.  William, however, took full advantage of the limited educational resources available in a small New England town.  During this period he adopted strong anti-slavery views of his own.  He became a consummate diarist beginning with a boyhood diary in 1858, continuing with a detailed wartime diary 1861 through 1865, and concluding with a comprehensive journal of his key role in reconstruction of the post-war South 1866-1868.

His interest in the greater world in which he lived is typified by a letter to his father in late 1860 in which he predicted Lincoln's election as president.  His 18-year-old crystal ball proved murky, however, when in the same letter he predicted with all the assurance of youthful bravado that the "fire eaters of South Carolina" would never follow through on their threat to secede if Lincoln were elected.

Civil War Service
Confederate cannons fired on Fort Sumter in Charleston Harbor on April 12, 1861, and William Stone's boyhood diary records that on May 8 he signed up as an eighteen-year-old volunteer to subdue the Rebellion.  After seven weeks of drilling with other volunteers, he "went into camp" on June 28, 1861 as a private in the Nineteenth Massachusetts Infantry Regiment.

Stone fought in major Civil War battles at Savage Station, Antietam, Chancellorsville, and Gettysburg.  After sustaining a severe wound at Antietam, he was commissioned a Second Lieutenant.  Following his third wound at Gettysburg, he was posted to an administrative position in Philadelphia.

Freedmen's Bureau Service
At the close of the war in 1865, Stone elected to stay in the army.  In early 1866, now a brevet Major, he was assigned to the newly created Freedmen's Bureau.  Designed by Congress to bridge the gap between slavery and citizenship for some four million largely illiterate African Americans, the Bureau represented America's first great social engineering project.  As an agent of the Bureau in South Carolina, Stone struggled (against the violent resistance of the planter class and the Ku Klux Klan) to achieve the Bureau's objectives of education, equality in the courts, and fair labor standards for the newly freed slaves.  He frequently presided over provost courts to ensure fair treatment of freedmen in legal disputes, and was instrumental in establishing schools for children of former slaves in his part of South Carolina.

Marriage and Children
In 1869, Major Stone married Mary Taylor, a Quaker from Pennsylvania who had been assigned by the Society of Friends to teach black children in South Carolina.  They proceeded to have two sons, Alfred and Herbert (who went on to become editor and publisher of Yachting and who was instrumental in re-establishing the Bermuda Yacht Races).

Legal and political career
In 1870, Stone resigned from the army and, aided by his extensive self-study, his agile mind, and driving ambition, was certified to practice law in South Carolina.  Following a successful law career in Charleston, he became active in state politics and, in 1876, was appointed by Governor Daniel Henry Chamberlain as Attorney General for South Carolina.

Final Years
When Governor Chamberlain's re-election was overturned by Wade Hampton in 1877, Stone returned with his family to the North, and established a highly successful career as an attorney in New York City.  He died in New York City in 1897, and is buried next to his wife in the Quaker Cemetery in Longwood Gardens, Pennsylvania.

Notes

References
Adams, John G. B. Reminiscences of the Nineteenth Massachusetts Regiment. Boston Wright & Potter Printing Company 1899.
Edgar, Walter. South Carolina: A History. Columbia, SC: University of South Carolina Press, 1998.
Foner, Eric. Reconstruction: America's Unfinished Revolution, 1863-1877.  New York: Harper & Row, 1988.
Suzanne Stone Johnson, Robert Johnson, introduction by Dr. Lou Falkner Williams, Kansas State University,  Bitter Freedom  William Stone's Record of Service in the Freedmen's Bureau. Columbia, SC: University of South Carolina Press, 2008.
Williams, Lou Falkner. The Great South Carolina Ku Klux Klan Trials, 1871-1872, Athens, GA: University of Georgia Press, 1996.
Zuczek, Richard.  State of Rebellion: Reconstruction in South Carolina. Columbia, SC: University of South Carolina Press, 1996

1842 births
1897 deaths
People from East Machias, Maine
People from Salem, Massachusetts
People of the Reconstruction Era
United States Army officers
Union Army officers
South Carolina Attorneys General
People of Massachusetts in the American Civil War
People of Maine in the American Civil War
People from Bolton, Massachusetts
19th-century American politicians